Section Commander George Walter Inwood GC (22 September 1905 – 16 October 1940) of the Home Guard was posthumously awarded the George Cross for the "...highest form of cool courage and self-sacrifice for others" he displayed on the night of the 15/16 October 1940 during the Birmingham Blitz.

Biography

Not much is known of George's life before the military. Inwood was born on 22 September 1905, the son of George Walter Inwood (aka William Thomas Inwood) and Margaret Caroline (née Jones) and was baptised in St. Martin's, Birmingham, (then in Warwickshire, now in the West Midlands county), on 11 October 1905. He is buried in plot 46739 of Yardley Cemetery in Birmingham.

15/16 October 1940
"Immediately following an intense air raid on the night of 15/16th October 1940, Section Commander Inwood was asked by the police to assist in rescue duty in Bishop Street, Birmingham (in the Five Ways area).

Taking charge of a party of six volunteers, he found that several people were imprisoned in a gas-filled cellar. A small hole was made and Section Commander Inwood was lowered into the cavity. With great difficulty he succeeded in bringing up two males alive. Although nearly exhausted, he entered the cavern a third time and was overcome by the fumes, being dragged out by one of his comrades. Despite the attention of a doctor and nurse, it was impossible to revive Section Commander Inwood.

He showed the highest form of cool courage and self-sacrifice for others."

George Cross citation
Notice of his Inwood's George Cross appeared in the London Gazette on 27 May 1941.

His widow received his award at an investiture on 10 October 1941. The medal is now displayed at Birmingham Museum and Art Gallery.

Notes



1905 births
1940 deaths
British Home Guard soldiers
British recipients of the George Cross
British military personnel killed in World War II
Military personnel from Birmingham, West Midlands
Deaths by airstrike during World War II